Dhanya is a genus of beetles in the family Carabidae, containing the following species:

 Dhanya andrewesi Stork, 1985 
 Dhanya bioculata Andrewes, 1919
 Dhanya brancuccii Deuve, 2007 
 Dhanya cylindrella Stork, 1985 
 Dhanya mulu Stork, 1985 
 Dhanya parallela Andrewes, 1919 
 Dhanya seminigra Andrewes, 1929

References

Paussinae